Pseudopedobacter saltans is a species of heparinase-producing bacteria. Pedobacter saltans was reclassified to Pseudopedobacter saltans.

References

Further reading
Liolios, Konstantinos, et al. "Complete genome sequence of the gliding, heparinolytic Pedobacter saltans type strain (113T)." Standards in genomic sciences 5.1 (2011): 30.
Whitman, William B., et al., eds. Bergey's manual® of systematic bacteriology. Vol. 5. Springer, 2012.

External links
LPSN

Sphingobacteriia
Bacteria described in 1998